Saleem Badat is a South African sociologist, higher education policy specialist, and researcher. He is Research Professor in Humanities at the University of Kwazulu-Natal.

Early politics 
Badat was eighteen years old when the 1976 Soweto Uprising occurred, which shaped his political consciousness and eventually his student activism. Badat served on the student wages commission and the Release Mandela Committee. He was initially aligned to the Black Consciousness Movement, and later joined the charterist United Democratic Front (UDF) following its founding in 1983. Badat was the editor of the Western Cape community newspaper, Grassroots.

Career 
Badat started his professional career as researcher into higher education policy at the University of the Western Cape under the tutelage of Harold Wolpe. Upon Wolpe's untimely death, Badat took over as the Director of the Education Policy Unit. In 1999, he became the founding CEO of the South African Council on Higher Education, a position which he held until 2006. In his role as CEO, he built the Council up to serve as statutory advisory and national accreditation body for higher education in South Africa. From June 2006 until July 2014, Badat served as the first black vice-chancellor of Rhodes University in Grahamstown, South Africa.

Badat holds Bachelors and Honours degrees in the Social Sciences from the University of KwaZulu-Natal, a Certificate in Higher Education and Science Policy from Boston University, and a Doctor of Philosophy in Sociology from the University of York.

Between August 2014 and December 2018, he was the Program Director of the International Higher Education and Strategic Projects program at the Andrew W. Mellon Foundation. His portfolio encompassed grant making in the arts and humanities to research universities in South Africa, Uganda, Ghana, Egypt, and Lebanon and to pan-African and pan-Arab institutions working in higher education.

Over the course of his career, Badat has also served on numerous boards, commissions, and committees, including as chairperson of Higher Education South Africa (now: Universities South Africa) and the Association of African Universities Scientific Committee on Higher Education.

Badat has received several honorary degrees during his career. In 2004, the University of the Free State awarded him an honorary doctorate for his contributions to higher education policy, followed in 2008 by an honorary doctorate from his alma mater, the University of York, and eventually in 2015, he received an honorary doctorate from Rhodes University.

Publications 
As a critical sociologist, Badat's core research and writings deal with the politics of transition from an apartheid society to a socially just, democratic society, typically but not exclusively with special reference to the education sector. Based on his PhD, Badat published in  2002 Black Student Politics, Higher Education and Apartheid from SASO to SANSCO, 1968-1990  (HSRC Press, republished in 2016 by Taylor & Francis). In 2009 he published Black Man, You are on Your Own (Steve Biko Foundation / STE Publishers 2010), and 2012/2013, The Forgotten People: Political Banishment under Apartheid (Jacana Press and Brill). In addition to his book publications, Badat published over 50 scholarly articles and numerous policy briefs and recommendations.

References

Living people
Academic staff of the University of KwaZulu-Natal
Academic staff of Rhodes University
1957 births
People from Durban
Vice-Chancellors of Rhodes University